Ņikita Jevpalovs (born 9 September 1994) is a Latvian professional ice hockey forward currently playing for the Boxers de Bordeaux in the Ligue Magnus (FRA).

Playing career

Jevpavlos spent his junior career between Canada and Latvia, mostly playing in the Quebec Major Junior Hockey League with Blainville-Boisbriand Armada. Undrafted, on January 1, 2015, he was signed by San Jose Sharks to a two-year entry-level agreement.

In his rookie professional season in 2015–16, Jevpavlovs was reassigned by the Sharks between the ECHL and AHL playing for the Allen Americans and San Jose Barracuda. In the following 2016–17 season, he exclusively played with the Barracuda, notching a professional high 13 goals and 21 points in 65 games.

At the expiration of his contract with the Sharks, Jevpalovs was not tendered a qualifying offer and returned to Latvia to play for Dinamo Riga of the Kontinental Hockey League on July 4, 2017. He made his KHL debut in the 2017–18 season opening match against Avangard Omsk, and scored his first goal on 31 August in a defeat to Spartak Moscow. He completed the season scoring just 5 goals and 8 points in 46 games.

As a free agent, Jevpalovs opted for a return to North America, agreeing to a one-year AHL contract with the Laval Rocket, affiliate to the Montreal Canadiens on July 1, 2018. After scoring a career-high 25 points in the AHL, Jevpalovs signed a subsequent one-year, one-way contract with Laval.

Following his second season with the Laval Rocket and with the COVID-19 pandemic delaying the 2020–21 North American season, Jevpalovs opted to remain in Europe by signing a one-year contract with Austrian outfit, the Dornbirn Bulldogs, on 1 September 2020.

International play
Jevpavlos represented Latvia on junior level. He was selected by Bob Hartley for 2018 world championships roster. He made his WC debut on opening game against Norway.

Career statistics

Regular season and playoffs

International

References

External links

 

1994 births
Living people
Allen Americans players
Blainville-Boisbriand Armada players
Boxers de Bordeaux players
Dinamo Riga players
Dornbirn Bulldogs players
Laval Rocket players
Latvian ice hockey forwards
HK Riga players
San Jose Barracuda players
Ice hockey people from Riga